Jute is a long, soft, shiny vegetable fiber that can be spun into coarse, strong threads.

Jute may also refer to:
 Jutes, a Germanic people
 Corchorus, a genus of plants from which the fiber is derived
 Corchorus capsularis, white jute
 Corchorus olitorius, Nalta jute or Tossa jute
 Abutilon theophrasti, Chinese jute
 Hibiscus cannabinus, Java jute
 Ministry of Textiles and Jute